Zhang Yangyang (born 20 February 1989 in Siping, Jilin) is a female Chinese rower, who competed for Team China at the 2008 Summer Olympics.

Records
2006/2007 National Championships – 3rd single sculls;
2007/2008 World Cup Austria/Munich – 4th quadruple sculls;

References
 
 Zhang Yangyang at the-sports.org

1989 births
Living people
Chinese female rowers
Olympic gold medalists for China
Olympic rowers of China
People from Siping
Rowers at the 2008 Summer Olympics
Rowers at the 2012 Summer Olympics
Olympic medalists in rowing
Rowers from Jilin
Medalists at the 2008 Summer Olympics
20th-century Chinese women
21st-century Chinese women